Melocalamus is a genus of Asian bamboos in the grass family. It is found in lowland areas of Southern China, Indochina, and the eastern part of the Indian Subcontinent.

Species

Formerly included
see Dinochloa 
Melocalamus macclellandii - Dinochloa macclellandii

References

Bambusoideae
Bambusoideae genera